Daniel ("Dan") Stephen Rowley Robinson (born 13 January 1975 in Cheltenham) is a former English long-distance runner who specialises in the marathon. He represented Great Britain in the marathon at the 2004 and  2008 Olympic games.

He finished in 12th place in the 2005 World Championships and in 2006 won the bronze medal at the Commonwealth Games.  He finished in 9th place in the 2007 London Marathon, securing his place in the Great Britain team for the World Championships in Osaka, where he finished in 11th position.

He ran at the 2009 Great North Run and was the first British man to finish, taking twelfth place. He set a marathon personal best at the 2009 Amsterdam Marathon, recorded a time of 2:12:14 and finishing eleventh. At the 2010 London Marathon, he had to drop out mid-race due to a calf injury. However, remained confident of running at both the 2010 European Athletics Championships and 2010 Commonwealth Games, which he had achieved the qualifying times for.

Achievements

Personal bests
10,000 metres (track) - 29:31.98 min (2001 Watford)
10 kilometres (road) - 29:12 min (2007 Manchester)
Half marathon - 1:03:42 hrs (2001 Reading)
Marathon - 2:12:14 hrs (2009 Amsterdam)

References

External links
Dan Robinson on BBC Gloucestershire
Here's a brief account of how to approach training for London Marathon.



1975 births
Living people
English male marathon runners
Athletes (track and field) at the 2004 Summer Olympics
Athletes (track and field) at the 2008 Summer Olympics
Olympic athletes of Great Britain
Commonwealth Games bronze medallists for England
Athletes (track and field) at the 2006 Commonwealth Games
Commonwealth Games medallists in athletics
Medallists at the 2006 Commonwealth Games